Acleris flavivittana, the multiform leafroller moth, is a species of moth of the family Tortricidae. It is found in North America, where it has been recorded from Georgia, Illinois, Indiana, Kentucky, Maine, Maryland, Massachusetts, Michigan, New Brunswick, New Hampshire, New Jersey, New York, North Carolina, Ohio, Ontario, Pennsylvania, Quebec, Tennessee, Vermont, Virginia, Washington, West Virginia and Wisconsin.

The wingspan is 18–19 mm. Adults are variable in color, but most have blackish-brown forewings with light brown spotting along the costa and outer margin and strong scale-tufting. Paler specimens have a deep blackish basal area and other specimens are more evenly purple brown with pale streaking along the inner margin. Adults have been recorded on wing year round.

The larvae feed on Malus pumila and Prunus pensylvanica.

References

Moths described in 1864
flavivittana
Moths of North America